The sjambok or litupa is a heavy leather whip. It is traditionally made from an adult hippopotamus or rhinoceros hide, but is also commonly made out of plastic.

This strip is then rolled until reaching a tapered-cylindrical form. The resulting whip is both flexible and durable. A plastic version was made for the apartheid era South African Police, and used for riot control.

Peter Hathaway Capstick describes a sjambok as a short swordlike whip made from rhino pizzle leather that could lay a man open like a straight razor.

The sjambok was heavily used by the Voortrekkers driving their oxen while migrating from the Cape of Good Hope, and remains in use by herdsmen to drive cattle. They are widely available in South Africa from informal traders to regular stores from a variety of materials, lengths and thicknesses.

Use by police
In South Africa, use of the sjambok by police is sometimes seen as synonymous with the apartheid era, but its use on people started much earlier. It is sometimes used outside the official judiciary by people who carry out punishments imposed by extralegal courts.

In 1963, an enquiry into the police force of Sheffield in the United Kingdom found that rhino whips had been used on suspects.

Other types

The name seems to have originated as cambuk in Indonesia, where it was the name of a wooden rod for punishing slaves, where it was possibly derived from the Persian chabouk or chabuk. When Malay slaves arrived in South Africa in the 1800s, the instrument and its name were imported with them, the material was changed to hide, and the name was finally incorporated into Afrikaans, spelled as sambok. It is known in Bengali as chabuk.

The instrument is also known as imvubu (hippopotamus in Zulu), kiboko (hippopotamus in Swahili) and as mnigolo (hippopotamus in  Malinké). In the Portuguese African colonies and Congo Free State, it was called a chicote, from the Portuguese word for whip.

In the Belgian Congo, the instrument was also known as fimbo and was used to force labour from local people through flogging, sometimes to death.  The official tariff for punishment in this case was lowered in time from twenty strokes to eight, then (in 1949) six, and progressively four and two, until flogging was outlawed completely in 1955. In North Africa, particularly Egypt, the whip was called a kurbash, after the Arabic for whip. The term shaabuug is used in the Somali language; it can also refer to a generic leather whip.

In popular culture
In the film Would You Rather, players are given the option to stab a fellow contestant with an ice pick or whip another contestant with a sjambok.

In Willard Price's Elephant Adventure, the cruel Arab slaver known as the Thunder Man enjoys flogging captives with a sjambok made from hippopotamus hide.

The Islamic preacher Shah Mustafa is known to have used a chabuk to defeat a snake which was on the throne of Raja Chandra Narayan Singh. This earned him the title of Chabukmar.

References

Whips
Police weapons
African weapons
Afrikaans words and phrases
South African English